was a Japanese daimyō of the early Edo period.  Shigemune's daimyō family claimed descent from the Shibukawa branch of the Seiwa Genji.  The Itakura identified its clan origins in Mikawa Province.  The descendants of Itakura Katsushige, including the descendants of his eldest son Shigemune, were known as the elder branch of the clan.   In 1622, his service was rewarded by his assignment as daimyō of Sekiyado Domain.  Shigemune's court title was Suō no Kami.

Biography
Shigemune was the eldest son of Itakura Katsushige. He was chosen to be one of Tokugawa Ieyasu's pages at a young age, and Ieyasu is said to have liked Shigemune greatly. Shigemune took part in both the Battle of Sekigahara and the Siege of Osaka Castle. His childhood name was Jusaburo (十三郎).

In 1620, Shigemune was appointed to the position as the third Kyoto Shoshidai; and he would continue in this significant role for over 30 years (1620–1654).  As shoshidai, he was actively and personally engaged as the head of a network of spies tasked to discover and report any covert sources of sedition, insurrection or other kinds of unrest.

In the subtle currents of shogunate politics, he is said to have gone to great lengths to develop a sense of impartiality in judgement. When approached with a case to judge, he would place a lantern between himself and the speaker, and busy himself with making tea, so that he would not let external appearances interfere with his sense of justice.

Shigemune was expected to guard the palace and to supervise court officials; but over time, he learned  that this office was no sinecure.  For example, when Emperor Go-Kōmyō took fencing lessons, Shigemune is reported to have threatened to commit suicide, and Go-Kōmyō is said to have replied, "I have never seen a military man kill himself, and the spectacle will be interesting. You had better have a platform erected in the palace grounds so that your exploit can be witnessed."  Both men somehow found a way to survive this impasse.

Shigemune died at Sekiyado.

The merit earned by Shigemune's loyal service to the shogunate was remembered years later when devastation of the Itakura family was threatened by the otherwise unpardonable actions of a descendant.  In 1739, Hosokawa Munetake of Higo was killed inside Edo Castle by Itakura Katsukane, and the killer was ordered to commit suicide as just punishment; however, Shōgun Yoshimune personally intervened to mitigate untoward adverse consequences for the killer's fudai family.

Shigemune's grave is at Kōetsu-ji temple, in Kyoto. He also has a grave at Chōen-ji, in Nishio, Aichi.

Family
 Father: Itakura Katsushige
 Mother: Ao Nagakatsu’s daughter
 Wives:
 Naruse Masanari’s daughter
 Toda Ujikane’s daughter
 Children
 Itakura Shigesato (1619-1662) by Toda Ujikane’s daughter
 Itakura Shigekata (1620-1684)
 daughter married Naitō Masakatsu
 daughter married Honda Toshinaga
 daughter married Ōta Sukemune
 daughter married Endō Yoshitoshi
 daughter married Morikawa Shigemasa
 daughter married Matsudaira Mitsushige 
 daughter married Naitō Tadamasa
 daughter married Matsudaira Terutsuna
 daughter married Matsudaira Terutsuna (as 2nd wife)
 Juko-in married Ichihashi Masanobu 
 Senshō-in married Matsudaira Sukenobu

Notes

References
 Bolitho, Harold. (1974). Treasures Among Men: The Fudai Daimyo in Tokugawa Japan. New Haven: Yale University Press.  ;  OCLC 185685588
 Meyer, Eva-Maria. (1999). Japans Kaiserhof in de Edo-Zeit: Unter besonderer Berücksichtigung der Jahre 1846 bis 1867. Münster: Tagenbuch. 
 Murdoch, James and Isoh Yamagata. (1903–1926). London: Kegan Paul, Trubner. OCLC 502662122
 Nussbaum, Louis Frédéric and Käthe Roth. (2005). Japan Encyclopedia. Cambridge: Harvard University Press. ; OCLC 48943301
 Papinot, Edmond. (1906) Dictionnaire d'histoire et de géographie du japon. Tokyo: Librarie Sansaisha...Click link for digitized 1906 Nobiliaire du japon (2003)
 Porter, Robert P. (2001).  Japan: the Rise of A Modern Power.  Boston: Adamant Media. 
 Screech, Timon. (2006). Secret Memoirs of the Shoguns:  Isaac Titsingh and Japan, 1779–1822. London: RoutledgeCurzon.  ' OCLC 635224064

External links
 Samples of correspondence from Shigemune's tenure as Kyoto Shoshidai
 Pictures relating to Shigemune, including his grave at Chōen-ji

|-

Daimyo
Itakura clan
Kyoto Shoshidai
1586 births
1657 deaths